Kyle Frederick Snyder (born November 20, 1995) is an American freestyle wrestler and graduated folkstyle wrestler who competes at 97 kilograms. He holds the distinctions of being the youngest Olympic Gold medalist and the youngest World Champion in American wrestling history.

Snyder is also the youngest wrestler ever to win the World, NCAA, and Olympic championships in the same year — a triple crown of American wrestling that had not been accomplished in a generation until he completed his sweep at the 2016 Rio Olympics.

Snyder, nicknamed "Snyderman", became the first Olympic Gold Medalist to return to college and win an NCAA title, clinching his second consecutive NCAA heavyweight title in 2017 despite tearing cartilage in his chest in the quarter-finals and being out-weighed by upwards of 40 pounds throughout the tournament. In 2018, Snyder won his third straight individual NCAA title as a heavyweight, this time being out-weighed by nearly 60 pounds "in one of the biggest size differences in an NCAA championship match in history", and became the first three-time NCAA heavyweight champion in nearly 30 years.

Along the way he became the youngest American, and only the eleventh ever, to win the Ivan Yarygin Memorial Grand Prix, which is widely considered to be the toughest open wrestling tournament in the world. Snyder dominated it with three technical-falls and then a pin in the finals. The following year Snyder would become the first American man not only to win back-to-back Yarygin titles, but the only one to win the prestigious tournament more than once at all, earning him Best Foreign Wrestler honors from his Russian hosts.

In 2017, Snyder defeated Abdulrashid Sadulaev at the 2017 World Championships, marking Sadulaev's first loss in his last 75 matches and the second one in his whole career. This come-from-behind victory earned Team USA its first World Championship in over 20 years and Snyder his third consecutive individual World or Olympic championship, and led to Snyder being ranked as the best pound for pound freestyle wrestler on the planet by Flowrestling in September 2017, a title he would retain in their June 2018 rankings. Snyder's accomplishments led him to being named the winner of the 2017 AAU Sullivan Award, presented annually to top amateur athlete in the United States. He ended his collegiate career as the first wrestler to win the NCAA, World, and Olympic championships as a student athlete.

Career
In his first three years of high school at Our Lady of Good Counsel High School in Olney, MD, Snyder amassed a 179–0 record, won three Prep National Championships, and only conceded a single takedown.  Named the national high school wrestler of the year by both Intermat and ASICS, Snyder was also ranked as the #1 pound-for-pound high school wrestler in America by Flowrestling after his junior season. He then spent his senior year training at the United States Olympic Training Center, competing internationally for Team USA and winning America's first Junior World Championship in over 20 years while becoming the youngest two-time Junior World medalist in 
American history.

To begin his collegiate wrestling career, Snyder accepted a scholarship from the Ohio State Buckeyes,  helping them to an NCAA team championship as a true freshman by finishing as runner-up to a fifth-year senior, Iowa State's Kyven Gadson, in the national finals.  A few weeks later he rebounded from this loss with remarkable resilience: Snyder defeated returning Olympic gold medalist Jake Varner for a chance to represent the U.S. on its 2015 World Team, then became the youngest World Champion in American wrestling history by dethroning the reigning World Champion. Snyder continued his extraordinary run by returning to Ohio State and rallying for an overtime victory over NC State University's Nick Gwiazdowski, the returning back-to-back heavyweight national champion.  Even giving away more than 30 pounds Snyder was able to end Gwiazdowski's 88-match win streak and earn his first individual NCAA title as a true sophomore.

A few months later Snyder would win his historic gold at the 2016 Rio Olympics — capping-off his unprecedented streak of winning wrestling's three most prestigious championships in succession before his 21st birthday, defeating the man holding each title along the way.

After returning to Ohio State and winning his second consecutive NCAA heavyweight title at the end of an undefeated 2016–2017 wrestling season, Snyder would avenge his loss to Gadson in the finals of America's 2017 World Team Trials, sweeping him with two straight tech-falls and a cumulative score of 23–2. He would then face another historic bout in the finals of the 2017 Paris World Championships: with Russia and the U.S. tied for first place at 53 points each, Snyder stepped onto the mat for "The Match of the Century" – the team championship, an individual title at 97 kg, and two young legacies were on the line. His opponent was Abdulrashid Sadulaev, a young Russian phenom on a three-year undefeated streak that included two World Championships as well as an Olympic gold, who was then considered the best pound-for-pound wrestler in the world.

Sadulaev moved-up a weight class specifically to challenge Snyder, and quickly took a 2–0 lead early in their finals match. But Snyder battled back, and tied the match at 3–3 before the end of the first period, only to have Sadulaev score another takedown and regain the lead. A lead that lasted until the final 20 seconds of the match when Snyder's furious pace allowed him to score a late takedown at the edge of the mat – sealing Team USA's first World Championship in over 20 years, Snyder's third consecutive individual World or Olympic championship, and wresting the title of best pound-for-pound wrestler on the planet away from Sadulaev.

And in a story recounted to The Washington Post by his college coach, Tom Ryan, after Snyder's thrilling come-from-behind overtime victory which clinched his first NCAA heavyweight title in front of a sold-out Madison Square Garden – a match chosen by fans to be the final one of the night and broadcast live in primetime to millions on ESPN – a maintenance worker approached Ryan to let him know what made Snyder, who'd already made wrestling history as America's youngest World Champion and was named Most Outstanding Wrestler of those NCAA Championships, stand out from his competition the most that weekend: he'd been the only athlete in the entire tournament who continually thanked him for refilling the stadium's water jugs.

High school and junior
Snyder amassed a 179–0 record in his first three years of high school before becoming the youngest American in over 20 years to win a FILA Junior World Championship in August 2013. Snyder was coached by two former World Champions during his gold medal match: Bill Zadick of the Iowa Hawkeyes, who was a college teammate of Jeff McGinness, the youngest ever American FILA Junior World Champion who won the tournament in 1992, as well as Zeke Jones. Although Snyder was unable to repeat his gold medal run in 2014, he brought home a bronze medal, and in the process became the youngest two-time Junior World medalist in American history.

Before bringing home his Junior World title in 2013, Snyder had already decided to forgo his senior year of high school competition and instead compete internationally as a resident athlete at the United States Olympic Training Center  beginning in the fall of 2013. In the spring of 2014, at 18 years of age, Snyder was selected to represent Team USA as the youngest-ever member of the Beat the Streets All-Star team that faced off against top-ranked wrestlers from across the world, where he wrestled alongside fellow Americans with multiple NCAA championships and Olympic gold medals such as David Taylor, Brent Metcalf and Jordan Burroughs. Snyder, who competes internationally at 96 kg, lost a tightly contested exhibition match 6–3 against Khadzhimurat Gatsalov, the No. 1-ranked wrestler in the world at 120 kg who at 31 years old had won five World Championships and an Olympic gold medal. A few weeks later, Snyder secured a place on his second consecutive United States Junior World Team, winning by technical fall in the national finals.

Snyder hoped to repeat his championship run at the Junior World Championships in 2014, though fell short and lost to Georgy Gogaev of Russia from North Ossetia-Alania in the quarterfinals, and wrestled back for a bronze. Earlier in 2014, Gogaev had defeated two former Division I (NCAA) champions Dustin Kilgore and Cam Simaz, both of whom had won their NCAA titles years earlier, in 2011 and 2012 respectively – while Snyder was still competing in high school.

Junior record

! colspan="7"| Junior matches
|-
!  Res.
!  Record
!  Opponent
!  Score
!  Date
!  Event
!  Location
|-
! style=background:white colspan=7 |2014 Junior World  at 96 kg
|-
|Win
|8–1
|align=left| Hamidreza Jamshidi
|style="font-size:88%"|7–1
|style="font-size:88%" rowspan=5|August 8, 2014
|style="font-size:88%" rowspan=5|Junior World Championship
|style="text-align:left;font-size:88%;" rowspan=5| Zagreb
|-
|Win
|7–1
|align=left| Angel Gochev
|style="font-size:88%"|Tech Fall
|-
|Loss
|6–1
|align=left| Georgi Gogaev
|style="font-size:88%"|1–8
|-
|Win
|6–0
|align=left| Said Gamidov
|style="font-size:88%"|8–2
|-
|Win
|5–0
|align=left| Alxios Kaouslidis
|style="font-size:88%"|Tech Fall
|-
! style=background:white colspan=7 |2013 Junior World  at 96 kg
|-
|Win
|4–0
|align=left| Viktor Kazishvili
|style="font-size:88%"|11–4
|style="font-size:88%" rowspan=4|August 17, 2013
|style="font-size:88%" rowspan=4|Junior World Championship
|style="text-align:left;font-size:88%;" rowspan=4| Sofia
|-
|Win
|3–0
|align=left| Robin Ferdinand
|style="font-size:88%"|8–0
|-
|Win
|2–0
|align=left| Yasup Malachmagomedov
|style="font-size:88%"|3–1
|-
|Win
|1–0
|align=left| Radu Balaur
|style="font-size:88%"|4–1
|-

Olympic, collegiate, and senior
Snyder, just 19 years old at the time, defeated the reigning World Champion at 97 kg, Russia's Abdusalam Gadisov, for his 2015 World Championship in Las Vegas.  And then less than one year later, Snyder bested Azerbaijan's Khetag Gazyumov, a former World Champion and two-time Olympic medalist, for his Rio Olympic gold.  Additionally, to earn the honor of representing the United States of America on each of those national teams, Snyder had to beat reigning London 2012 Olympic gold medalist Jake Varner in both America's 2015 World Team Trials and the 2016 Olympic Team Trials. Since USA Wrestling's National Team Trials use a best two-out-of-three format for their finals, Snyder had to beat the returning Olympic gold medalist a total of four times, which he did with a cumulative score of 21–6 over the course of their matches.

Snyder, who wrestled collegiately for the Ohio State Buckeyes, is also a three-time NCAA Division I National Champion. His first was won with an overtime victory in a sold-out Madison Square Garden which snapped his opponent's 88-match winning streak, preventing North Carolina State University's Nick Gwiazdowski from winning his third consecutive NCAA heavyweight title. Weighing in for the 285 lb. Heavyweight division at just 226 pounds, Snyder was the lightest heavyweight in the field and was named Most Outstanding Wrestler of the tournament.

For his two international championships Snyder was rewarded with over a quarter million dollars by the Living the Dream Medal Fund, which was founded by "two former collegiate wrestlers-turned Wall Street tycoons," billionaire investment banker Michael E. Novogratz and real estate developer David Barry.  Snyder was well endowed with $250,000 for his 2016 Summer Olympics gold and earlier received $50,000 for his 2015 World Championship, money he is allowed to keep since the NCAA made an exception to its rules against student-athlete financial compensation for the Fund.

NCAA record

! colspan="8"| NCAA record
|-
!  Res.
!  Record
!  Opponent
!  Score
!  Date
!  Event
|-
! style=background:white colspan=6 |NCAA  at 285 lbs
|-
|Win
|75–5
|align=left|Adam Coon
|style="font-size:88%"|3–2
|style="font-size:88%" rowspan=5|March 15, 2018
|style="font-size:88%" rowspan=5|NCAA Championships
|-
|Win
|74–5
|align=left|Jacob Kasper
|style="font-size:88%"|10–5
|-
|Win
|73–5
|align=left|Derek White
|style="font-size:88%"|6–3
|-
|Win
|72–5
|align=left|Jere Heino
|style="font-size:88%"|Tech Fall
|-
|Win
|71–5
|align=left|Ryan Solomon
|style="font-size:88%"|15–5
|-
! style=background:white colspan=6 |Big Ten  at 285 lbs
|-
|Win
|70–5
|align=left|Adam Coon
|style="font-size:88%"|4–2
|style="font-size:88%" rowspan=4|Mar 3, 2018
|style="font-size:88%" rowspan=4|Big Ten Championships
|-
|Win
|69–5
|align=left|Nick Nevills
|style="font-size:88%"|14–5
|-
|Win
|68–5
|align=left|Shawn Streck
|style="font-size:88%"|17–6
|-
|Win
|67–5
|align=left|Fletcher Miller
|style="font-size:88%"|Tech Fall
|-
|Win
|66–5
|align=left|Michael Boykin
|style="font-size:88%"|Tech Fall
|style="font-size:88%"|Feb 18, 2018
|style="font-size:88%"|Ohio State – North Carolina Dual
|-
|Loss
|65–5
|align=left|Adam Coon
|style="font-size:88%"|1–3
|style="font-size:88%"|Feb 11, 2018
|style="font-size:88%"|Ohio State – Michigan Dual
|-
|Win
|65–4
|align=left|Nick Nevills
|style="font-size:88%"|15–10
|style="font-size:88%"|Feb 3, 2018
|style="font-size:88%"|Ohio State – Penn State Dual
|-
|Win
|64–4
|align=left|Steven Holloway
|style="font-size:88%"|Tech Fall
|style="font-size:88%"|Jan 21, 2018
|style="font-size:88%"|Iowa – Ohio State Dual
|-
|Win
|63–4
|align=left|Rylee Streifel
|style="font-size:88%"|Tech Fall
|style="font-size:88%"|Jan 12, 2018
|style="font-size:88%"|Minnesota – Ohio State Dual
|-
|Win
|62–4
|align=left|Razohnn Gross
|style="font-size:88%"|Fall
|style="font-size:88%"|Jan 7, 2018
|style="font-size:88%"|Ohio State – Rutgers Dual
|-
|Win
|61–4
|align=left|Stacey Ben
|style="font-size:88%"|Fall
|style="font-size:88%"|Dec 17, 2017
|style="font-size:88%"|Ohio State – Chattanooga Dual
|-
|Win
|60–4
|align=left|Devin Nye
|style="font-size:88%"|Fall
|style="font-size:88%"|Nov 21, 2017
|style="font-size:88%"|Kent State – Ohio State Dual
|-
|Win
|59–4
|align=left|Austin Harris
|style="font-size:88%"|Fall
|style="font-size:88%"|Nov 12, 2017
|style="font-size:88%"|Arizona State – Ohio State Dual
|-
! style=background:white colspan=6 |NCAA  at 285 lbs
|-
|Win
|58–4
|align=left|Conor Medbery
|style="font-size:88%"|6–3
|style="font-size:88%" rowspan=5|Mar 16, 2017
|style="font-size:88%" rowspan=5|NCAA Championships
|-
|Win
|57–4
|align=left|Jacob Kasper
|style="font-size:88%"|19–6
|-
|Win
|56–4
|align=left|Michael Kroells
|style="font-size:88%"|13–7
|-
|Win
|55–4
|align=left|Ryan Garrett
|style="font-size:88%"|Tech Fall
|-
|Win
|54–4
|align=left|Jake Gunning
|style="font-size:88%"|Tech Fall
|-
! style=background:white colspan=6 |Big Ten  at 285 lbs
|-
|Win
|53–4
|align=left|Connor Medbery
|style="font-size:88%"|8–5
|style="font-size:88%" rowspan=3|Mar 4, 2017
|style="font-size:88%" rowspan=3|Big Ten Championship
|-
|Win
|52–4
|align=left|Michael Kroells
|style="font-size:88%"|14–7
|-
|Win
|51–4
|align=left|Razohnn Gross
|style="font-size:88%"|Tech Fall
|-
|Win
|50–4
|align=left|Colin Jensen
|style="font-size:88%"|16–6
|style="font-size:88%"|Feb 10, 2017
|style="font-size:88%"|Ohio State – Nebraska Dual
|-
|Win
|49–4
|align=left|Razohnn Gross
|style="font-size:88%"|Tech Fall
|style="font-size:88%"|Feb 6, 2017
|style="font-size:88%"|Rutgers – Ohio State Dual
|-
|Win
|48–4
|align=left|Nick Nevills
|style="font-size:88%"|19–9
|style="font-size:88%"|Feb 3, 2017
|style="font-size:88%"|Penn State – Ohio State Dual
|-
|Win
|47–4
|align=left|Hemida Youssef
|style="font-size:88%"|Tech Fall
|style="font-size:88%"|Jan 22, 2017
|style="font-size:88%"|Maryland – Ohio State Dual
|-
|Win
|46–4
|align=left|Deuce Rachal
|style="font-size:88%"|Fall
|style="font-size:88%"|Jan 15, 2017
|style="font-size:88%"|Illinois – Ohio State Dual
|-
|Win
|45–4
|align=left|Austin Myers
|style="font-size:88%"|Fall
|style="font-size:88%"|Dec 8, 2016
|style="font-size:88%"|Missouri – Ohio State Dual
|-
|Win
|44–4
|align=left|Devin Nye
|style="font-size:88%"|Fall
|style="font-size:88%"|Nov 22, 2016
|style="font-size:88%"|Ohio State – Kent State Dual
|-
|Win
|43–4
|align=left|Michael Furbee
|style="font-size:88%"|Fall
|style="font-size:88%"|Nov 22, 2016
|style="font-size:88%"|Ohio State – Cleveland State Dual
|-
|Win
|42–4
|align=left|Tanner Hall
|style="font-size:88%"|20–18
|style="font-size:88%"|Nov 19, 2016
|style="font-size:88%"|Ohio State – Arizona State Dual
|-
! style=background:white colspan=6 |NCAA  at 285 lbs
|-
|Win
|41–4
|align=left|Nick Gwiazdowski
|style="font-size:88%"|7–5
|style="font-size:88%" rowspan=5|Mar 17, 2016
|style="font-size:88%" rowspan=5|NCAA Championship
|-
|Win
|40–4
|align=left|Ty Walz
|style="font-size:88%"|10–6
|-
|Win
|39–4
|align=left|Amarveer Dhesi
|style="font-size:88%"|16–5
|-
|Win
|38–4
|align=left|Tanner Harms
|style="font-size:88%"|Tech Fall
|-
|Win
|37–4
|align=left|Antonio Pelusi
|style="font-size:88%"|Fall
|-
! style=background:white colspan=6 |Big Ten  at 285 lbs
|-
|Win
|36–4
|align=left|Adam Coon
|style="font-size:88%"|7–4
|style="font-size:88%" rowspan=3|Mar 5, 2016
|style="font-size:88%" rowspan=3|Big Ten Championship
|-
|Win
|35–4
|align=left|Collin Jensen
|style="font-size:88%"|Tech Fall
|-
|Win
|34–4
|align=left|Brooks Black
|style="font-size:88%"|Tech Fall
|-
|Win
|33–4
|align=left|Brock Horwath
|style="font-size:88%"|Tech Fall
|style="font-size:88%"|Feb 12, 2016
|style="font-size:88%"|Wisconsin – Ohio State Dual
|-
|Win
|32–4
|align=left|Jan Johnson
|style="font-size:88%"|Tech Fall
|style="font-size:88%"|Feb 5, 2016
|style="font-size:88%"|Ohio State – Penn State Dual
|-
|Win
|31–4
|align=left|Collin Jensen
|style="font-size:88%"|20–9
|style="font-size:88%"|Jan 17, 2016
|style="font-size:88%"|Nebraska – Ohio State Dual
|-
|Loss
|30–4
|align=left|Kyven Gadson
|style="font-size:88%"|Fall
|style="font-size:88%" rowspan=5|Mar 19, 2015
|style="font-size:88%" rowspan=5|NCAA Championships
|-
|Win
|30–3
|align=left|J'den Cox
|style="font-size:88%"|3–2
|-
|Win
|29–3
|align=left|Scott Schiller
|style="font-size:88%"|3–2
|-
|Win
|28–3
|align=left|Shane Woods
|style="font-size:88%"|14–5
|-
|Win
|27–3
|align=left|Braden Atwood
|style="font-size:88%"|12–4
|-
|Loss
|26–3
|align=left|Morgan McIntosh
|style="font-size:88%"|1–4
|style="font-size:88%" rowspan=3|Mar 7, 2015
|style="font-size:88%" rowspan=3|Big Ten Championships
|-
|Win
|26–2
|align=left|Nathan Burak
|style="font-size:88%"|3–2
|-
|Win
|25–2
|align=left|Timmy McCall
|style="font-size:88%"|6–2
|-
|Win
|24–2
|alig26–1n=left|Elliot Riddick
|style="font-size:88%"|9–1
|style="font-size:88%"|Feb 21, 2015
|style="font-size:88%"|Ohio State – Lehigh Dual
|-
|Win
|23–2
|align=left|Vince Pickett
|style="font-size:88%"|Tech Fall
|style="font-size:88%"|Feb 15, 2015
|style="font-size:88%"|Ohio State – Edinboro Dual
|-
|Win
|22–2
|align=left|Scott Schiller
|style="font-size:88%"|3–1
|style="font-size:88%"|Feb 6, 2015
|style="font-size:88%"|Minnesota – Ohio State Dual
|-
|Win
|21–2
|align=left|Hayden Hrymack
|style="font-size:88%"|Tech Fall
|style="font-size:88%"|Feb 1, 2015
|style="font-size:88%"|Ohio State – Rutgers Dual
|-
|Win
|20–2
|align=left|Tanner Lynde
|style="font-size:88%"|18–7
|style="font-size:88%"|Jan 30, 2015
|style="font-size:88%"|Purdue – Ohio State Dual
|-
|Win
|19–2
|align=left|Rob Fitzgerals
|style="font-size:88%"|19–9
|style="font-size:88%"|Jan 25, 2015
|style="font-size:88%"|Ohio State – Maryland Dual
|-
|Win
|18–2
|align=left|Luke Sheridan
|style="font-size:88%"|18–7
|style="font-size:88%"|Jan 23, 2015
|style="font-size:88%"|Indiana – Ohio State Dual
|-
|Win
|17–2
|align=left|Max Hunyley
|style="font-size:88%"|5–2
|style="font-size:88%"|Jan 18, 2015
|style="font-size:88%"|Ohio State – Michigan Dual
|-
|Win
|16–2
|align=left|Nick McDiarmid
|style="font-size:88%"|17–6
|style="font-size:88%"|Jan 16, 2015
|style="font-size:88%"|Ohio State – Michigan State Dual
|-
|Win
|15–2
|align=left|Morgan McIntosh
|style="font-size:88%"|6–1
|style="font-size:88%"|Jan 11, 2015
|style="font-size:88%"|Penn State – Ohio State Dual
|-
|Loss
|14–2
|align=left|Nathan Burak
|style="font-size:88%"|1–2
|style="font-size:88%"|Jan 4, 2015
|style="font-size:88%"|Iowa – Ohio State Dual
|-
|Win
|14–1
|align=left|Johnny Eblen
|style="font-size:88%"|15–5
|style="font-size:88%"|Dec 14, 2014
|style="font-size:88%"|Missouri – Ohio State Dual
|-
|Win
|13–1
|align=left|Jace Bennett
|style="font-size:88%"|18–7
|style="font-size:88%" rowspan=6|Dec 5, 2014
|style="font-size:88%" rowspan=6|Cliff Keen Las Vegas Invitational
|-
|Win
|12–1
|align=left|Trent Noon
|style="font-size:88%"|16–6
|-
|Loss
|11–1
|align=left|Kyven Gadson
|style="font-size:88%"|2–3
|-
|Win
|11–0
|align=left|Lucas Sheridan
|style="font-size:88%"|14–4
|-
|Win
|10–0
|align=left|Micah Barnes
|style="font-size:88%"|14–4
|-
|Win
|9–0
|align=left|Josh Popple
|style="font-size:88%"|13–7
|-
|Win
|8–0
|align=left|Chance McClure
|style="font-size:88%"|20–6
|style="font-size:88%"|Nov 24, 2014
|style="font-size:88%"|Ohio State – Virginia Dual
|-
|Win
|7–0
|align=left|Jared Haught
|style="font-size:88%"|8–5
|style="font-size:88%"|Nov 23, 2014
|style="font-size:88%"|Ohio State – Virginia Tech Dual
|-
|Win
|6–0
|align=left|Josh DaSilveira
|style="font-size:88%"|21–8
|style="font-size:88%"|Nov 15, 2014
|style="font-size:88%"|Arizona State – Ohio State Dual
|-
|Win
|5–0
|align=left|Cole Baxter
|style="font-size:88%"|11–6
|style="font-size:88%"|Nov 13, 2014
|style="font-size:88%"|Kent State – Ohio State Dual
|-
|Win
|4–0
|align=left|Max Huntley
|style="font-size:88%"|10–5
|style="font-size:88%" rowspan=4|Nov 2, 2014
|style="font-size:88%" rowspan=4|Michigan State Open
|-
|Win
|3–0
|align=left|Phil Wellington
|style="font-size:88%"|11–4
|-
|Win
|2–0
|align=left|Nick McDiarmid
|style="font-size:88%"|8–2
|-
|Win
|1–0
|align=left|Jake Smith
|style="font-size:88%"|21–7

NCAA stats

!  Season
!  Year
!  School
!  Rank
!  Weigh class
!  Record
!  Win
!  Bonus
|-
|2018
|Senior
|rowspan=4|Ohio State
|#1
|285
|17–1
|94.44%
|76.92%
|-
|2017
|Junior
|#1
|285
|17–0
|100.00%
|76.47%
|-
|2016
|Sophomore
|#1
|285
|11–0
|100.00%
|72.73%
|-
|2015
|Freshman
|#3
|197
|30–4
|88.24%
|50.00%
|-
|colspan=5 bgcolor="LIGHTGREY"|Career
|bgcolor="LIGHTGREY"|75–5
|bgcolor="LIGHTGREY"|93.75%
|bgcolor="LIGHTGREY"|64.00%

Freestyle record

! colspan="7"| Senior Freestyle Matches
|-
!  Res.
!  Record
!  Opponent
!  Score
!  Date
!  Event
!  Location
|-
! style=background:white colspan=7 |
|-
|Win
|153–16
|align=left| Mamed Ibragimov
|style="font-size:88%"|TF 11–0
|style="font-size:88%" rowspan=3|July 18, 2022
|style="font-size:88%" rowspan=3|2022 Zouhaier Sghaier Ranking Series
|style="text-align:left;font-size:88%;" rowspan=3| Tunis, Tunisia
|-
|Win
|152–16
|align=left| Polat Polatçı
|style="font-size:88%"|TF 12–1
|-
|Win
|151–16
|align=left| Burak Bilal Şahin
|style="font-size:88%"|Fall
|-
! style=background:white colspan=7 |
|-
|Win
|150–16
|align=left| Kollin Moore
|style="font-size:88%"|TF 12–2
|style="font-size:88%" rowspan=2|June 3, 2022
|style="font-size:88%" rowspan=2|2022 Final X: Stillwater
|style="text-align:left;font-size:88%;" rowspan=2|
 Stillwater, Oklahoma
|-
|Win
|149–16
|align=left| Kollin Moore
|style="font-size:88%"|TF 11–0
|-
! style=background:white colspan=7 |
|-
|Win
|148–16
|align=left| Arturo Silot
|style="font-size:88%"|TF 12–1
|style="font-size:88%" rowspan=3|May 8, 2022
|style="font-size:88%" rowspan=3|2022 Pan American Continental Championships
|style="text-align:left;font-size:88%;" rowspan=3| Acapulco, Mexico
|-
|Win
|147–16
|align=left| Nishan Randhawa
|style="font-size:88%"|TF 11–0
|-
|Win
|146–16
|align=left| Luis Perez
|style="font-size:88%"|TF 10–0
|-
! style=background:white colspan=7 | 
|-
|Win
|145–16
|align=left| J'den Cox
|style="font-size:88%"|7–2
|style="font-size:88%" rowspan=2|March 16, 2022
|style="font-size:88%" rowspan=2|RUDIS+ Super Match: Snyder vs. Cox
|style="text-align:left;font-size:88%;" rowspan=2|
 Detroit, Michigan
|-
|Win
|144–16
|align=left| J'den Cox
|style="font-size:88%"|5–5
|-
|Win
|143–16
|align=left| Zbigniew Baranowski
|style="font-size:88%"|TF 12–0
|style="font-size:88%"|February 12, 2022
|style="font-size:88%"|2022 Bout at the Ballpark
|style="text-align:left;font-size:88%;"|
 Arlington, Texas
|-
! style=background:white colspan=7 | 
|-
|Win
|142–16
|align=left| Shamil Musaev
|style="font-size:88%"|8–3
|style="font-size:88%" rowspan=4|January 27–30, 2022
|style="font-size:88%" rowspan=4|Golden Grand Prix Ivan Yarygin 2022
|style="text-align:left;font-size:88%;" rowspan=4|
 Krasnoyarsk, Russia
|-
|Win
|141–16
|align=left| Soslan Dzhagaev
|style="font-size:88%"|TF 14–4
|-
|Win
|140–16
|align=left| Igor Ovsyannikov
|style="font-size:88%"|TF 12–2
|-
|Win
|139–16
|align=left| Devid Dzugaev
|style="font-size:88%"|TF 11–0
|-
! style=background:white colspan=7 |
|-
|Win
|138–16
|align=left| Ali Aliyev
|style="font-size:88%"|TF 18–8
|style="font-size:88%" rowspan=4|December 10, 2021
|style="font-size:88%" rowspan=4|2021 International in Memory of the XIX–XX Wrestlers
|style="text-align:left;font-size:88%;" rowspan=4| Khasavyurt, Dagestan
|-
|Win
|137–16
|align=left| Shamil Musaev
|style="font-size:88%"|TF 13–3
|-
|Win
|136–16
|align=left| Aslanbek Sotiev
|style="font-size:88%"|TF 11–0
|-
|Win
|135–16
|align=left| Khokh Khugaev
|style="font-size:88%"|TF 10–0
|-
! style=background:white colspan=7 |
|-
|Loss
|134–16
|align=left| Abdulrashid Sadulaev
|style="font-size:88%"|0–6
|style="font-size:88%"|October 5, 2021 
|style="font-size:88%" rowspan=4|2021 World Championships
|style="text-align:left;font-size:88%;" rowspan=4|
 Oslo, Norway
|-
|Win
|134–15
|align=left| Mojtaba Goleij
|style="font-size:88%"|3–2
|style="font-size:88%" rowspan=3|October 4, 2021 
|-
|Win
|133–15
|align=left| Magomedgaji Nurov
|style="font-size:88%"|TF 11–0
|-
|Win
|132–15
|align=left| Ölziisaikhany Batzul
|style="font-size:88%"|TF 14–4
|-
! style=background:white colspan=7 |
|-
|Loss
|131–15
|align=left| Abdulrashid Sadulaev
|style="font-size:88%"|3–6
|style="font-size:88%" rowspan=4|August 6–7, 2021
|style="font-size:88%" rowspan=4|2020 Summer Olympics
|style="text-align:left;font-size:88%;" rowspan=4|
 Tokyo, Japan
|-
|Win
|131–14
|align=left| Süleyman Karadeniz
|style="font-size:88%"|5–0
|-
|Win
|130–14
|align=left| Abraham Conyedo
|style="font-size:88%"|6–0
|-
|Win
|129–14
|align=left| Jordan Steen
|style="font-size:88%"|TF 12–2
|-
! style=background:white colspan=7 |
|-
|Win
|128–14
|align=left| Luis Perez
|style="font-size:88%"|TF 11–0
|style="font-size:88%" rowspan=5|May 30, 2021
|style="font-size:88%" rowspan=5|2021 Pan American Continental Championships
|style="text-align:left;font-size:88%;" rowspan=5| Guatemala City, Guatemala
|-
|Win
|127–14
|align=left| Marcos Carrozzino
|style="font-size:88%"|TF 10–0
|-
|Win
|126–14
|align=left| Maxwell Lacey
|style="font-size:88%"|TF 10–0
|-
|Win
|125–14
|align=left| Kenett Andrey Martínez Viloria
|style="font-size:88%"|TF 12–0
|-
|Win
|124–14
|align=left| Richard Deschatelets
|style="font-size:88%"|TF 10–0
|-
! style=background:white colspan=7 | 
|-
|Win
|123–14
|align=left| Kollin Moore
|style="font-size:88%"|5–1
|style="font-size:88%" rowspan=2|April 3, 2021
|style="font-size:88%" rowspan=2|2020 US Olympic Team Trials
|style="text-align:left;font-size:88%;" rowspan=2|
 Fort Worth, Texas
|-
|Win
|122–14
|align=left| Kollin Moore
|style="font-size:88%"|TF 10–0
|-
|Win
|121–14
|align=left| Gabe Dean
|style="font-size:88%"|TF 13–2
|style="font-size:88%" rowspan=3|February 23, 2021
|style="font-size:88%" rowspan=3|NLWC V
|style="text-align:left;font-size:88%;" rowspan=3|
 State College, Pennsylvania
|-
|Win
|120–14
|align=left| Scott Boykin
|style="font-size:88%"|TF 11–0
|-
|Win
|119–14
|align=left| Nate Jackson
|style="font-size:88%"|6–1
|-
! style=background:white colspan=7 | 
|-
|Win
|118–14
|align=left| Radu Lefter
|style="font-size:88%"|TF 11–0
|style="font-size:88%" rowspan=3|January 16, 2021
|style="font-size:88%" rowspan=3|Grand Prix de France Henri Deglane 2021
|style="text-align:left;font-size:88%;" rowspan=3|
 Nice, France
|-
|Win
|117–14
|align=left| Radosław Baran
|style="font-size:88%"|9–2
|-
|Win
|116–14
|align=left| Erik Thiele
|style="font-size:88%"|TF 11–1
|-
|Win
|115–14
|align=left| Ty Walz
|style="font-size:88%"|TF 10–0
|style="font-size:88%"|December 22, 2020
|style="font-size:88%"|NLWC IV
|style="text-align:left;font-size:88%;"|
 State College, Pennsylvania
|-
! style=background:white colspan=7 |
|-
|Win
|114–14
|align=left| Jakob Woodley
|style="font-size:88%"|TF 10–0
|style="font-size:88%" rowspan=3|October 10–11, 2020
|style="font-size:88%" rowspan=3|2020 US Senior Nationals
|style="text-align:left;font-size:88%;" rowspan=3|
 Coralville, Iowa
|-
|Win
|113–14
|align=left| William Baldwin
|style="font-size:88%"|TF 12–0
|-
|Win
|112–14
|align=left| Jeremiah Casto
|style="font-size:88%"|Fall
|-
|Win
|111–14
|align=left| Michael Macchiavello
|style="font-size:88%"|TF 12–1
|style="font-size:88%"|September 19, 2020
|style="font-size:88%"|NLWC I
|style="text-align:left;font-size:88%;"|
 State College, Pennsylvania
|-
! style=background:white colspan=7 |
|-
|Win
|110–14
|align=left| Reineris Salas
|style="font-size:88%"|TF 11–1
|style="font-size:88%"rowspan=4|March 6–9, 2020
|style="font-size:88%"rowspan=4|2020 Pan American Wrestling Championships
|style="text-align:left;font-size:88%;"rowspan=4|
 Ottawa, Canada
|-
|Win
|109–14
|align=left| José Daniel Díaz
|style="font-size:88%"|9–1
|-
|Win
|108–14
|align=left| Evan Ramos
|style="font-size:88%"|TF 12–2
|-
|Win
|107–14
|align=left| Luis Perez
|style="font-size:88%"|TF 14–4
|-
! style=background:white colspan=7 |
|-
|Win
|106–14
|align=left| Abraham Conyedo
|style="font-size:88%"|TF 12–1
|style="font-size:88%" rowspan=4|January 15–18, 2020
|style="font-size:88%" rowspan=4|2020 Matteo Pellicone Ranking Series
|style="text-align:left;font-size:88%;" rowspan=4| Rome, Italy
|-
|Loss
|105–14
|align=left| Mohammad Hossein Mohammadian
|style="font-size:88%"|Fall
|-
|Win
|105–13
|align=left| İbrahim Bölükbaşı
|style="font-size:88%"|12–4
|-
|Win
|104–13
|align=left| Iliskhan Chilayev
|style="font-size:88%"|TF 10–0
|-
! style=background:white colspan=7 |
|-
|Win
|103–13
|align=left| Elizbar Odikadze
|style="font-size:88%"|5–0
|style="font-size:88%" rowspan=4|September 21–22, 2019
|style="font-size:88%" rowspan=4|2019 World Wrestling Championships
|style="text-align:left;font-size:88%;" rowspan=4| Nur-Sultan, Kazakhstan
|-
|Loss
|102–13
|align=left| Sharif Sharifov
|style="font-size:88%"|2–5
|-
|Win
|102–12
|align=left| Magomed Ibragimov
|style="font-size:88%"|TF 13–3
|-
|Win
|101–12
|align=left| Mausam Khatri
|style="font-size:88%"|TF 10–0
|-
! style=background:white colspan=7 |
|-
|Win
|100–12
|align=left| José Daniel Díaz
|style="font-size:88%"|9–3
|style="font-size:88%" rowspan=3|August 10, 2019
|style="font-size:88%" rowspan=3|2019 Pan American Games
|style="text-align:left;font-size:88%;" rowspan=3| Lima, Perú
|-
|Win
|99–12
|align=left| Reineris Salas
|style="font-size:88%"|3–1
|-
|Win
|98–12
|align=left| Evan Ramos
|style="font-size:88%"|TF 10–0
|-
! style=background:white colspan=7 |
|-
|Win
|97–12
|align=left| Ali Shabani
|style="font-size:88%"|2–1
|style="font-size:88%" rowspan=3|July 11–14, 2019
|style="font-size:88%" rowspan=3|2019 Yaşar Doğu International
|style="text-align:left;font-size:88%;" rowspan=3| Istanbul, Turkey
|-
|Win
|96–12
|align=left| Pavlo Oliynyk
|style="font-size:88%"|TF 10–0
|-
|Win
|95–12
|align=left| Baki Şahin
|style="font-size:88%"|TF 13–2
|-
! style=background:white colspan=7 |
|-
|Win
|94–12
|align=left| Kyven Gadson
|style="font-size:88%"|4–0
|style="font-size:88%" rowspan=2|June 14–15, 2019
|style="font-size:88%" rowspan=2|2019 US World Team Trials
|style="text-align:left;font-size:88%;" rowspan=2| Lincoln, Nebraska
|-
|Win
|93–12
|align=left| Kyven Gadson
|style="font-size:88%"|TF 10–0
|-
|Win
|92–12
|align=left| Nishan Randhawa
|style="font-size:88%"|TF 15-1
|style="font-size:88%"|May 6, 2019
|style="font-size:88%"|2019 Beat the Streets
|style="text-align:left;font-size:88%;" |
 New York City, New York
|-
! style=background:white colspan=7 |
|-
|Win
|91–12
|align=left| Jordan Steen
|style="font-size:88%"|TF 10–0
|style="font-size:88%" rowspan=2|April 21, 2019
|style="font-size:88%" rowspan=2|2019 Pan American Wrestling Championships
|style="text-align:left;font-size:88%;" rowspan=2| Buenos Aires, Argentina
|-
|Win
|90–12
|align=left| Evan Ramos
|style="font-size:88%"|TF 11–1
|-
! style=background:white colspan=7 |
|-
|Win
|89–12
|align=left| Valeriy Andriytsev
|style="font-size:88%"|4–0
|style="font-size:88%" rowspan=4|February 28 – March 3, 2019
|style="font-size:88%" rowspan=4|2019 Dan Kolov – Nikola Petrov Memorial
|style="text-align:left;font-size:88%;" rowspan=4| Ruse, Bulgaria
|-
|Win
|88–12
|align=left| Baki Şahin
|style="font-size:88%"|TF 11–0
|-
|Win
|87–12
|align=left| Murazi Mchedlidze
|style="font-size:88%"|8–5
|-
|Win
|86–12
|align=left| Ty Walz
|style="font-size:88%"|TF 12–1
|-
! style=background:white colspan=7 |
|-
|Loss
|85–12
|align=left| Rasul Magomedov
|style="font-size:88%"|5–6
|style="font-size:88%"|January 24, 2019
|style="font-size:88%"|2019 Ivan Yarygin Golden Grand Prix
|style="text-align:left;font-size:88%;"|
 Krasnoyarsk, Russia
|-
! style=background:white colspan=7 |
|-
|Loss
|85–11
|align=left| Abdulrashid Sadulaev
|style="font-size:88%"|Fall
|style="font-size:88%" rowspan=5|October 22–23, 2017
|style="font-size:88%" rowspan=5|2018 World Wrestling Championships
|style="text-align:left;font-size:88%;" rowspan=5| Budapest, Hungary
|-
|Win
|85–10
|align=left| Pavlo Oliynyk
|style="font-size:88%"|3–0
|-
|Win
|84–10
|align=left| Abraham Conyedo
|style="font-size:88%"|11–2
|-
|Win
|83–10
|align=left| Nathaniel Tuamoheloa
|style="font-size:88%"|TF 10–0
|-
|Win
|82–10
|align=left| Ölziisaikhany Batzul
|style="font-size:88%"|8–3
|-
! style=background:white colspan=7 |
|-
|Win
|81–10
|align=left| Rıza Yıldırım
|style="font-size:88%"|TF 11–0
|style="font-size:88%" rowspan=3|July 27–29, 2018
|style="font-size:88%" rowspan=3|2018 Yaşar Doğu International
|style="text-align:left;font-size:88%;" rowspan=3| Istanbul, Turkey
|-
|Loss
|80–10
|align=left| Aslanbek Alborov
|style="font-size:88%"|3-3
|-
|Win
|80–9
|align=left| Alireza Goodarzi
|style="font-size:88%"|TF 10–0
|-
! style=background:white colspan=7 |
|-
|Win
|79–9
|align=left| Kyven Gadson
|style="font-size:88%"|10–2
|style="font-size:88%" rowspan=2|June 8–9, 2018
|style="font-size:88%" rowspan=2|2018 Final X: Lincoln
|style="text-align:left;font-size:88%;" rowspan=2| Lincoln, Nebraska
|-
|Win
|78–9
|align=left| Kyven Gadson
|style="font-size:88%"|9–0
|-
|Win
|77–9
|align=left| Reineris Salas
|style="font-size:88%"|9–8
|style="font-size:88%"|May 17, 2018
|style="font-size:88%"|2018 Beat the Streets
|style="text-align:left;font-size:88%;" |
 New York City, New York
|-
! style=background:white colspan=7 |
|-
|Win
|76–9
|align=left| Roman Bakirov
|style="font-size:88%"|TF 14–3
|style="font-size:88%" rowspan=4|April 7–8, 2018
|style="font-size:88%" rowspan=4|2018 Wrestling World Cup - Men's freestyle
|style="text-align:left;font-size:88%;" rowspan=4| Iowa City, Iowa
|-
|Win
|75–9
|align=left| Givi Matcharashvili
|style="font-size:88%"|TF 10–0
|-
|Win
|74–9
|align=left| Taira Sonoda
|style="font-size:88%"|TF 10–0
|-
|Win
|73–9
|align=left| Viky Viky
|style="font-size:88%"|TF 10–0
|-
! style=background:white colspan=7 |
|-
|Win
|72–9
|align=left| Ruslan Magomedov
|style="font-size:88%"|4–1
|style="font-size:88%" rowspan=4|January 28, 2018
|style="font-size:88%" rowspan=4|Golden Grand Prix Ivan Yarygin 2018
|style="text-align:left;font-size:88%;" rowspan=4| Krasnoyarsk, Russia
|-
|Win
|71–9
|align=left| Vladislav Baitcaev
|style="font-size:88%"|5–1
|-
|Win
|70–9
|align=left| Yunus Dede
|style="font-size:88%"|6–2
|-
|Win
|69–9
|align=left| Sohbet Belliyev
|style="font-size:88%"|TF 10–0
|-
! style=background:white colspan=7 | 
|-
|Win
|68–9
|align=left| Vladislav Baitcaev
|style="font-size:88%"|TF 11–0
|style="font-size:88%" rowspan=5|December 7–8, 2017
|style="font-size:88%" rowspan=5|2017 World Wrestling Clubs Cup - Men's freestyle
|style="text-align:left;font-size:88%;" rowspan=5|
 Tehran, Iran
|-
|Win
|67–9
|align=left| Batsukh Zorigtbaatar
|style="font-size:88%"|TF 12–2
|-
|Win
|66–9
|align=left| Dimitar Karaivanov
|style="font-size:88%"|TF 10–0
|-
|Win
|65–9
|align=left| Somveer Kadian
|style="font-size:88%"|TF 10–0
|-
|Win
|64–9
|align=left| Khajeh Salehani
|style="font-size:88%"|9–3
|-
! style=background:white colspan=7 |
|-
|Win
|61–9
|align=left| Abdulrashid Sadulaev
|style="font-size:88%"|6–5
|style="font-size:88%" rowspan=4|August 26, 2017
|style="font-size:88%" rowspan=4|2017 World Wrestling Championships
|style="text-align:left;font-size:88%;" rowspan=4| Paris, France
|-
|Win
|60–9
|align=left| Aslanbek Alborov
|style="font-size:88%"|9–2
|-
|Win
|59–9
|align=left| Naoya Akaguma
|style="font-size:88%"|TF 10–0
|-
|Win
|58–9
|align=left| Mamed Ibragimov
|style="font-size:88%"|TF 10–0
|-
! style=background:white colspan=7 |
|-
|Win
|57–9
|align=left| Martin Erasmus
|style="font-size:88%"|TF 10–0
|style="font-size:88%" rowspan=4|July 15–16, 2017
|style="font-size:88%" rowspan=4|2017 Grand Prix of Spain
|style="text-align:left;font-size:88%;" rowspan=4| Madrid, Spain
|-
|Win
|56–9
|align=left| Hossein Shahbazigazvar
|style="font-size:88%"|TF 10–0
|-
|Win
|55–9
|align=left| Adam Kariaev
|style="font-size:88%"|TF 10–0
|-
|Win
|54–9
|align=left| Sven Engström
|style="font-size:88%"|TF 10–0
|-
! style=background:white colspan=7 |
|-
|Win
|53–9
|align=left| Kyven Gadson
|style="font-size:88%"|TF 13–2
|style="font-size:88%" rowspan=2|June 9–10, 2017
|style="font-size:88%" rowspan=2|2017 US World Team Trials
|style="text-align:left;font-size:88%;" rowspan=2| Lincoln, Nebraska
|-
|Win
|52-9
|align=left| Kyven Gadson
|style="font-size:88%"|TF 10–0
|-
|Win
|51–9
|align=left| Koki Yamamoto
|style="font-size:88%"|TF 10–0
|style="font-size:88%"|May 17, 2017
|style="font-size:88%"|2017 Beat the Streets
|style="text-align:left;font-size:88%;" |
 New York City, New York
|-
! style=background:white colspan=7 |
|-
|Win
|50–9
|align=left| Luis Perez
|style="font-size:88%"|TF 10–0
|style="font-size:88%" rowspan=3|May 5–7, 2017
|style="font-size:88%" rowspan=3|2017 Pan American Wrestling Championships
|style="text-align:left;font-size:88%;" rowspan=3| Salvador da Bahia, Brazil
|-
|Win
|49–9
|align=left| Nishanpreet Randhawa
|style="font-size:88%"|TF 10–0
|-
|Win
|48–9
|align=left| Felipe Cesar Camilo de Oliveira
|style="font-size:88%"|TF 11–0
|-
! style=background:white colspan=7 |
|-
|Win
|47–9
|align=left| Amir Mohammadi
|style="font-size:88%"|6–0
|style="font-size:88%" rowspan=4|February 16–17, 2017
|style="font-size:88%" rowspan=4|2017 Wrestling World Cup – Men's freestyle
|style="text-align:left;font-size:88%;" rowspan=4| Los Angeles, California
|-
|Loss
|46–9
|align=left| Aslanbek Alborov
|style="font-size:88%"|4–5
|-
|Win
|46–8
|align=left| Yuri Belonovski
|style="font-size:88%"|11–2
|-
|Win
|45–8
|align=left| Zviadi Metreveli
|style="font-size:88%"|TF 11–0
|-
! style=background:white colspan=7 |
|-
|Win
|44–8
|align=left| Ruslan Magomedov
|style="font-size:88%"|Fall
|style="font-size:88%" rowspan=4|January 27–29, 2017
|style="font-size:88%" rowspan=4|Golden Grand Prix Ivan Yarygin 2017
|style="text-align:left;font-size:88%;" rowspan=4| Krasnoyarsk, Russia
|-
|Win
|43–8
|align=left| Hossein Ramezanian
|style="font-size:88%"|TF 11–1
|-
|Win
|42–8
|align=left| Munkhzhargal Belgutei
|style="font-size:88%"|TF 11–1
|-
|Win
|41–8
|align=left| Chaganhzana
|style="font-size:88%"|TF 11–0
|-
! style=background:white colspan=7 | 
|-
|Loss
|40–8
|align=left| Abbas Tahan
|style="font-size:88%"|1-3
|style="font-size:88%" rowspan=4|November 30 - December 1, 2016
|style="font-size:88%" rowspan=4|2016 World Wrestling Clubs Cup
|style="text-align:left;font-size:88%;" rowspan=4|
 Kharkiv, Ukraine
|-
|Win
|40–7
|align=left| Murazi Mchedlidze
|style="font-size:88%"|6–3
|-
|Loss
|39–7
|align=left| Elizbar Odikadze
|style="font-size:88%"|2–2
|-
|Win
|39–6
|align=left| Andriy Vlasov
|style="font-size:88%"|Fall
|-
! style=background:white colspan=7 |
|-
|Win
|38–6
|align=left| Khetag Gazyumov
|style="font-size:88%"|2–1
|style="font-size:88%" rowspan=4|August 21, 2016
|style="font-size:88%" rowspan=4|2016 Summer Olympics
|style="text-align:left;font-size:88%;" rowspan=4| Rio de Janeiro, Brazil
|-
|Win
|37–6
|align=left| Elizbar Odikadze
|style="font-size:88%"|9–4
|-
|Win
|36–6
|align=left| Albert Saritov
|style="font-size:88%"|7–0
|-
|Win
|35–6
|align=left| Javier Cortina
|style="font-size:88%"|10–3
|-
! style=background:white colspan=7 |
|-
|Win
|34–6
|align=left| Serdar Boeke
|style="font-size:88%"|Fall
|style="font-size:88%" rowspan=4|July 2–3, 2016
|style="font-size:88%" rowspan=4|2016 Grand Prix of Germany
|style="text-align:left;font-size:88%;" rowspan=4| Dortmund, Germany
|-
|Loss
|33–6
|align=left| Khetag Gazyumov
|style="font-size:88%"|1–2
|-
|Win
|33–5
|align=left| José Daniel Díaz
|style="font-size:88%"|9–1
|-
|Win
|32–5
|align=left| Nicolai Ceban
|style="font-size:88%"|9–4
|-
! style=background:white colspan=7 |
|-
|Win
|31–5
|align=left| Elizbar Odikadze
|style="font-size:88%"|3–3
|style="font-size:88%" rowspan=4|June 11–12, 2016
|style="font-size:88%" rowspan=4|2016 Wrestling World Cup – Men's freestyle
|style="text-align:left;font-size:88%;" rowspan=4| Los Angeles, California
|-
|Win
|30–5
|align=left| Aslanbek Alborov
|style="font-size:88%"|2–1
|-
|Win
|29–5
|align=left| Abbas Tahan
|style="font-size:88%"|8–1
|-
|Win
|28–5
|align=left| Saywart Kadian
|style="font-size:88%"|TF 10–0
|-
! style=background:white colspan=7 |
|-
|Win
|27–5
|align=left| Jake Varner
|style="font-size:88%"|6–1
|style="font-size:88%" rowspan=3|April 8–10, 2016
|style="font-size:88%" rowspan=3|2016 US Olympic Team Trials
|style="text-align:left;font-size:88%;" rowspan=3| Iowa City, Iowa
|-
|Win
|26–5
|align=left| Jake Varner
|style="font-size:88%"|4–0
|-
|Loss
|25–5
|align=left| Jake Varner
|style="font-size:88%"|4–4
|-
! style=background:white colspan=7 |
|-
|Win
|25–4
|align=left| Erik Thiele
|style="font-size:88%"|3–0
|style="font-size:88%" rowspan=4|February 18–19, 2016
|style="font-size:88%" rowspan=4|2016 Alexandr Medved Prizes
|style="text-align:left;font-size:88%;" rowspan=4| Minsk, Belarus
|-
|Loss
|24–4
|align=left| Khadzhimurat Gatsalov
|style="font-size:88%"|2–5
|-
|Win
|24–3
|align=left| Yury Belonovskiy
|style="font-size:88%"|5–1
|-
|Win
|23–3
|align=left| Magomed Ibragimov
|style="font-size:88%"|7–0
|-
! style=background:white colspan=7 |
|-
|Win
|22–3
|align=left| Zaynula Kurbanov
|style="font-size:88%"|8–2
|style="font-size:88%" rowspan=4|January 27–29, 2016
|style="font-size:88%" rowspan=4|Golden Grand Prix Ivan Yarygin 2016
|style="text-align:left;font-size:88%;" rowspan=4| Krasnoyarsk, Russia
|-
|Loss
|21–3
|align=left| Anzor Boltukaev
|style="font-size:88%"|0–3
|-
|Win
|21–2
|align=left| Tornike Kvitatiani
|style="font-size:88%"|INJ (4–0)
|-
|Win
|20–2
|align=left| Georgi Dzukaev
|style="font-size:88%"|TF 10–0
|-
! style=background:white colspan=7 |
|-
|Win
|19–2
|align=left| Paulo Victor
|style="font-size:88%"|TF 10–0
|style="font-size:88%" rowspan=2|December 11–12, 2015
|style="font-size:88%" rowspan=2|2015 Brazil Cup
|style="text-align:left;font-size:88%;" rowspan=2| Contagem, Brazil
|-
|Win
|18–2
|align=left| Robson Kato
|style="font-size:88%"|TF 10–0
|-
! style=background:white colspan=7 |
|-
|Win
|17–2
|align=left| Abdusalam Gadisov
|style="font-size:88%"|5–5
|style="font-size:88%" rowspan=5|September 11, 2015
|style="font-size:88%" rowspan=5|2015 World Wrestling Championships
|style="text-align:left;font-size:88%;" rowspan=5| Las Vegas, Nevada
|-
|Win
|16–2
|align=left| Abbas Tahan
|style="font-size:88%"|6–3
|-
|Win
|15–2
|align=left| José Daniel Díaz
|style="font-size:88%"|TF 11–1
|-
|Win
|14–2
|align=left| Radosław Baran
|style="font-size:88%"|8–0
|-
|Win
|13–2
|align=left| Pavlo Oliynyk
|style="font-size:88%"|2–1
|-
! style=background:white colspan=7 |
|-
|Win
|12–2
|align=left| Arjun Gill
|style="font-size:88%"|TF 12–2
|style="font-size:88%" rowspan=3|July 18, 2015
|style="font-size:88%" rowspan=3|2015 Pan American Games
|style="text-align:left;font-size:88%;" rowspan=3| Toronto, Canada
|-
|Win
|11–2
|align=left| José Daniel Díaz
|style="font-size:88%"|TF 10–0
|-
|Win
|10–2
|align=left| Yuri Maier
|style="font-size:88%"|TF 11–1
|-
! style=background:white colspan=7 |
|-
|Win
|9–2
|align=left| Jake Varner
|style="font-size:88%"|3–0
|style="font-size:88%" rowspan=2|June 12–14, 2015
|style="font-size:88%" rowspan=2|2015 US World Team Trials
|style="text-align:left;font-size:88%;" rowspan=2| Madison, Wisconsin
|-
|Win
|8–2
|align=left| Jake Varner
|style="font-size:88%"|4–1
|-
|Win
|7–2
|align=left| Javier Cortina
|style="font-size:88%"|4–0
|style="font-size:88%"|May 21, 2015
|style="font-size:88%"|2015 Beat the Streets
|style="text-align:left;font-size:88%;" |
 New York City, New York
|-
! style=background:white colspan=7 |
|-
|Win
|6–2
|align=left| Jake Varner
|style="font-size:88%"|2–1
|style="font-size:88%" rowspan=4|May 7–9, 2015
|style="font-size:88%" rowspan=4|2015 US Senior National Championships
|style="text-align:left;font-size:88%;" rowspan=4| Las Vegas, Nevada
|-
|Win
|5–2
|align=left| J'den Cox
|style="font-size:88%"|4–3
|-
|Win
|4–2
|align=left| Dustin Kilgore
|style="font-size:88%"|TF 13–3
|-
|Win
|3–2
|align=left| Romero Cotton
|style="font-size:88%"|TF 10–0
|-
|Loss
|2–2
|align=left| Khadzhimurat Gatsalov
|style="font-size:88%"|3–6
|style="font-size:88%"|May 8, 2014
|style="font-size:88%"|2014 Beat the Streets
|style="text-align:left;font-size:88%;" |
 New York City, New York
|-
! style=background:white colspan=7 |
|-
|Win
|2–1
|align=left| Nodar Kurtanidze
|style="font-size:88%"|7–0
|style="font-size:88%" rowspan=3|November 29, 2013
|style="font-size:88%" rowspan=3|2013 Grand Prix de France Henri Deglane
|style="text-align:left;font-size:88%;" rowspan=3|
 Nice, France
|-
|Win
|1–1
|align=left| Jeremy Latour
|style="font-size:88%"|7–0
|-
|Loss
|0–1
|align=left| Leon Rattigan
|style="font-size:88%"|3–3
|-

Highlights
In the early minutes of his gold medal Junior World Championships match in 2013, Snyder was thrown to his back by his Armenian opponent, Viktor Kazishvili, and nearly pinned. After fighting off his back and down 4–1, Snyder then ran off 10 unanswered points to secure the victory by technical fall in four minutes and four seconds, his third in his four matches at the tournament.

During his 179–0 run during his first three years of high school, Snyder only gave up a single takedown. Snyder, who stopped playing football for his nationally ranked high school team following his sophomore season, is a two-time Washington Post All-Met Wrestler of the Year, and was named the male 2013 ASICS Wrestler of the Year as well as Intermat's 2013 Wrestler of the Year. In November 2013, Snyder became the #1 ranked "Pound for Pound" (P4P) American high school wrestler according to Flowrestling.org.

Undefeated in what are considered the top 3 toughest high school wrestling tournaments in America, Snyder won the Walsh Ironman twice, Beast of the East three times, and the Powerade Wrestling Tournament once. Snyder began wrestling for the Ohio State Buckeyes in 2014, placing second in the NCAA championships his freshman year at the 197-pound class individually, and winning a National Championship as part of the Buckeyes' 2014–15 team.

He initially planned to take an Olympic redshirt for the 2015–16 season, but instead chose to return for the Buckeyes and enroll in classes for the spring semester. At the NCAA championships, Snyder won at heavyweight, defeating two-time defending national champion Nick Gwiazdowski of North Carolina State University in overtime 7–5. Snyder was the lightest heavyweight in the field at 226 pounds and finished 11–0 on the season.

Snyder is a 2015 UWW world champion at age 19.

At the 2016 Summer Olympics, he won the Gold Medal bout 2–1 en route to becoming the youngest Olympic Wrestling Champion in USA history at the age of 20, beating Henry Cejudo's record.

Snyder has expressed an interest in Mixed martial arts, wanting to compete in the UFC. He planned to cross train Mixed martial arts with wrestling as he continued his historic world championship runs for Freestyle. Snyder however backtracked on his MMA desires. Snyder said, "I don’t think it’s even down the road. I don’t think that I’m going to fight. I think I’m going to wrestle as long as I can as long as [God] wants me to. We’ll see what happens after that. I don’t foresee it being fighting."

Awards and honors

2022
 Pan American Championship 97 kg

2021
 2020 Summer Olympics 97 kg

2019
 World Championship 97 kg
 Pan American Games 97 kg
 Yaşar Doğu 97 kg
 Pan American Championship 97 kg
 Dan Kolov Grand Prix 97 kg

2018
 World Championship 97 kg
 Yaşar Doğu 97 kg
 NCAA Division I 285 lbs
 Big Ten Conference 285 lbs
 Ivan Yarygin Grand Prix 97 kg

2017
 World Championship 97 kg
 Ivan Yarygin 97 kg
 Pan American Championships 97 kg
 NCAA Division I 285 lbs
 Big Ten Conference 285 lbs
Ohio State University Male Athlete of the Year
James E. Sullivan Award Winner

2016
 2016 Summer Olympics 97 kg
 NCAA Division I 285 lbs
 Big Ten Conference 285 lbs
 Most Outstanding Wrestler NCAA Division I championships 
Ohio State University Male Athlete of the Year

2015
USA Freestyle Wrestler of the Year
 World Championship world 97 kg
 Pan American Games 97 kg
 NCAA Division I 197 lbs
 Big Ten Conference 197 lbs
 NCAA Division I (team championship as a member of the Buckeyes)

2014
 UWW junior world 96 kg

2013
ASICS High School Wrestler of the Year
 UWW junior world 96 kg
 Maryland State Division I 220 lbs

2012
 Junior Nationals 96 kg
 Junior Nationals (Greco Roman) 96 kg
 Maryland State Division I 220 lbs

2011
 Cadet 96 kg
 Cadet (Greco Roman) 96 kg
 Maryland State Division I 215 lbs

Personal life
Snyder is married to Maddie Snyder. Snyder is a Christian.

In May 2018, President Donald Trump appointed Snyder to be a member of his Council on Sports, Fitness & Nutrition.

References

External links
 

1995 births
Living people
American male sport wrestlers
World Wrestling Championships medalists
Pan American Games gold medalists for the United States
Pan American Games medalists in wrestling
Wrestlers at the 2015 Pan American Games
Wrestlers at the 2016 Summer Olympics
Olympic gold medalists for the United States in wrestling
Olympic silver medalists for the United States in wrestling
Olympic medalists in wrestling
Ohio State Buckeyes wrestlers
Wrestlers at the 2019 Pan American Games
Medalists at the 2016 Summer Olympics
Big Ten Athlete of the Year winners
Medalists at the 2015 Pan American Games
Medalists at the 2019 Pan American Games
Pan American Wrestling Championships medalists
Wrestlers at the 2020 Summer Olympics
Medalists at the 2020 Summer Olympics
World Wrestling Champions